Cronos Airlines is a regional airline headquartered in Malabo, Equatorial Guinea. Cronos Airlines is a passenger and cargo carrier based at Malabo International Airport in Equatorial Guinea. It operates a service in Equatorial Guinea, Cameroon, Benin and Nigeria.

History
Cronos Air was founded in 2007 by its CEO, Andreas Kaïafas. It started operations in 2008, Cronos was created in 2008, with a small 19-seater and a license to operate for six months. It was a provisional license. They came back with a 30-seater at the end of 2009 and by July 2010 they had a 92-seater, the BA-146, which was operating in Germany before with Eurowings. They later acquired a second 98-seater and a 'certificado de transporte aéreo' (air transport certificate).

Destinations
Cronos Airlines operates the following services:

Cotonou - Cadjehoun Airport

Douala - Douala International Airport

Bata - Bata Airport
Malabo - Malabo International Airport
Mengomeyén

Port Harcourt - Port Harcourt International Airport
Lagos - Murtala Muhammed International Airport

Accra - Kotoka International Airport

Niamey - Diori Hamani International Airport

Fleet

The Cronos Airlines fleet consists of the following aircraft (as of September 2020):

Historical fleet
Cronos Airlines has previously operated the following aircraft:
 1 Avro RJ100
 1 BAe 146-300A
 1 Airbus A319-100
 2 Embraer ERJ 135LR

References

External links

Airlines banned in the European Union
Airlines of Equatorial Guinea
Airlines established in 2007
Equatoguinean companies established in 2007